Walter Earl Clay (January 8, 1924 – May 3, 2013) was an American football halfback and fullback.

Clay was born in Erie, Colorado, and attended Longmont High School in Longmont, Colorado. He played college football for Colorado. 

He played professional football in the All-America Football Conference for the Chicago Rockets from 1946 to 1947 and for the Los Angeles Dons from 1947 to 1949. He appeared in 47 games, 11 as a starter, and tallied 652 rushing yards, 218 receiving yards, 148 passing yards, and five touchdowns.

Clay died in 2013 at Charlotte, North Carolina.

References

1924 births
2013 deaths
People from Erie, Colorado
American football halfbacks
Chicago Rockets players
Los Angeles Dons players
Colorado Buffaloes football players
Players of American football from Colorado